Harry Hibbard (June 1, 1816 – July 28, 1872) was an American politician and a United States Representative from New Hampshire.

Early life
Born in Concord, Vermont, Hibbard pursued classical studies. He graduated from Dartmouth College, Hanover, New Hampshire in 1835 where he studied law. After graduation, he was admitted to the bar in 1838 and commenced practice in Bath, Grafton County, New Hampshire.

Career
Hibbard was an assistant clerk and clerk of the New Hampshire House of Representatives from 1840 to 1842. He served as an elected member of the New Hampshire House of Representatives from 1843 to 1845 and Speaker in 1844 and 1845. He served in the New Hampshire Senate in 1845, 1847, and 1848 and as president of that body in 1847 and 1848. In addition, he served as a delegate to the Democratic National Convention in 1848 and 1856.

Elected as a Democrat to the Thirty-first, Thirty-second, and Thirty-third Congresses, Hibbard served as United States Representative for the state of New Hampshire from (March 4, 1849 – March 3, 1855). He was not a candidate for renomination in 1854. After leaving Congress, he declined an appointment to the New Hampshire Supreme Court.

Death
Hibbard died in a sanatorium in Somerville, Massachusetts on July 28, 1872, and is interred at the Village Cemetery, Bath, New Hampshire.

Family life
Son of David and Susannah Streeter, Hibbard married Sara King Hale Bellows on May 13, 1848, and they had one daughter, Alice. Sarah was the daughter of Salma Hale, and had been married to Stephen R. Bellows, who died months after their marriage in 1843.

References

External links

Harry Hibbard (1816 - 1872)

1816 births
1872 deaths
Democratic Party members of the New Hampshire House of Representatives
Democratic Party New Hampshire state senators
Dartmouth College alumni
People from Concord, Vermont
Speakers of the New Hampshire House of Representatives
Democratic Party members of the United States House of Representatives from New Hampshire
19th-century American politicians
People from Bath, New Hampshire